Cliona Hagan (born 27 February 1989) is an Irish country music singer from Ballinderry, Co. Tyrone.

Career

The All Ireland Talent Show
Hagan appeared as a contestant on the 2009 first series of the RTÉ reality talent competition, The All Ireland Talent Show. Mentored by Eurovision winner Dana, Hagan made it the final of the competition, ultimately losing out to The Mulkerrins.

2010–2015
Following her appearance on The All Ireland Talent Show, Hagan began studying in Queen's University Belfast where she earned a degree in music. She went on to study in University of Edinburgh where she became qualified in secondary school Music teaching.

Between 2013 and 2015, Hagan worked as a schoolteacher. In 2016, she decided to give it up to pursue a career in singing.

2015–present
In a 2015 country music special edition of the long-running Irish chat show, The Late Late Late Show, Irish country music legend, Philomena Begley named Hagan as "One to watch" for the future of Irish country music.

Since then, Hagan has supported the likes of Nathan Carter, Derek Ryan and Mike Denver on tour across Ireland and Europe.

In March 2018, while Ireland was suffering the effects of Storm Emma Hagan performed two songs on The Late Late Late Show. One month later, Hagan returned to the show for their annual country music special performing a duet of 'Hurts So Good' alongside Nathan Carter.

In September 2018, Hagan was named Best Irish Country Female Artist at the Irish Post Country Music Awards.

In 2019, Hagan was announced as one of the celebrities taking part in the third series of Dancing with the Stars. Hagan was partnered with professional dancer, Robert Rowiński on the show. On 22 March 2019, they reached the final of the competition, finishing as joint-runners with Johnny Ward and Emily Barker up to eventual winners, Mairéad Ronan and John Nolan.

Discography

Albums

Non-album singles
"Irish Eyes Smiling at Christmas" (2015)
"When Love Comes Around the Bend" (2020)
"Thank You Mother" (2020)
"Need You Now" (duet with Simon Casey, 2020)
"I've Forgotten You" (2021)

References

External links
 Official site

1989 births
Living people
Musicians from County Tyrone
21st-century singers from Northern Ireland
Country singers from Northern Ireland
The All Ireland Talent Show contestants